Julio Echevarry (born 19 October 1957) is a Colombian former cyclist. He competed in the sprint event at the 1976 Summer Olympics.

References

External links
 

1957 births
Living people
Colombian male cyclists
Olympic cyclists of Colombia
Cyclists at the 1976 Summer Olympics
Place of birth missing (living people)
20th-century Colombian people